Zuidbarge is a neighbourhood and former village of Emmen in the Dutch province of Drenthe. The windmill Zeldenrust has been restored and is open to the public.

Zuidbarge was first mentioned in the 1416 as tot Zuytbarge. The name means the southern hill to distinguish itself from Noordbarge. In 1840, it was home to 205 people. In 1978, the village was annexed by neighbouring Emmen, and has become a neighbourhood.

Gallery

References 

Populated places in Drenthe
Emmen, Netherlands